Harry Clinton Dowda (December 29, 1922 – June 24, 1996) was an American football defensive back in the National Football League for the Washington Redskins and the Philadelphia Eagles.  He played college football at Wake Forest University.  He served three years in the Airborne and saw action in the Battle of Bulge and Crossing the Rhine.  In 1953, he was married with two children, and sold cars in the off-season.

Early life
Harry Dowda was born on December 29, 1922. He attended West Fulton High School in Georgia and Hickory High School in Hickory, North Carolina. Dowda attended Wake Forest University and played on their college football team. In 1947, Dowda was drafted into the NFL in the 19th round.

Football Career
Dowda was drafted in the 19th round (168th pick) in the 1947 NFL draft as a halfback. Dowda played for the Washington Redskins from 1949 to 1953. He then played for the Philadelphia Eagles from 1954 to 1955. In 1953, Dowda intercepted 5 passes and returned them 73 yards, scoring one touchdown.

Personal life
Harry Dowda was married in 1953 and had two children. In the off-season, Dowda sold cars.

References

External links

1922 births
1996 deaths
American football defensive backs
United States Army personnel of World War II
Players of American football from Atlanta
Philadelphia Eagles players
Wake Forest Demon Deacons football players
Washington Redskins players